This page presents the results of the women's volleyball tournament at the 1962 Asian Games, which was held from 25 to 27 August 1962 in Jakarta, Indonesia.

Japan won the gold medal in a round robin competition.

Results

|}

Final standing

References
 Results

External links
OCA official website

Women's volleyball